At the 1936 Summer Olympics, 14 wrestling events were contested, all for men. There were seven weight classes in Greco-Roman wrestling and seven classes in freestyle wrestling.

Medal table

Medal summary

Freestyle

Greco-Roman

Participating nations
A total of 200 wrestlers from 29 nations competed at the Berlin Games:

See also
List of World and Olympic Champions in men's freestyle wrestling
List of World and Olympic Champions in Greco-Roman wrestling

References

 
1936 Summer Olympics events
1936
1936
1936 in sport wrestling